Nemognathinae is a subfamily of blister beetles in the family Meloidae. There are about 8 genera and at least 120 described species in Nemognathinae.

Genera
These eight genera belong to the subfamily Nemognathinae:
 Cissites Latreille, 1804
 Gnathium Kirby, 1818
 Hornia Riley, 1877
 Nemognatha Illiger, 1807
 Pseudozonitis Dillon, 1952
 Rhyphonemognatha Enns, 1956
 Tricrania LeConte, 1860
 Zonitis Fabricius, 1775

References

Further reading

External links

 

Meloidae
Articles created by Qbugbot